Colin Richard Tincknell (born 8 August 1953) is an Australian politician and the Western Australian state leader of Pauline Hanson's One Nation. He was elected to the Western Australian Legislative Council at the 2017 state election, as a One Nation member in South West Region. His term ran from 2017 to 2021.

Tincknell was a corporate social responsibility manager for a number of mining companies before his appointment as the leader of One Nation in Western Australia. He was the first CEO of AFL New Zealand, from 2002 to 2004. He played for the Claremont Football Club in the 1970s and 1980s.

References

1953 births
Living people
One Nation members of the Parliament of Western Australia
Members of the Western Australian Legislative Council
English emigrants to Australia
Pauline Hanson's One Nation politicians
21st-century Australian politicians